Isotealia dubia is a species of sea anemone in the family Actiniidae. It is found in the North Pacific Ocean.

References

Actiniidae
Animals described in 1908